Corozal is a village on the north (Caribbean) coast of Honduras, located near the city of La Ceiba. The majority of Corozal's population belongs to the Garifuna (Black Carib) ethnic group.

Garifuna communities
Populated places in Honduras